Trung Thu may refer to:

Mid-Autumn Festival
Trung Thu, Dien Bien, Vietnam